Robert Underdunk Terwilliger Jr., PhD, better known as Sideshow Bob, is a recurring character in the animated television series The Simpsons. He is voiced by Kelsey Grammer and first appeared in the episode "The Telltale Head". Bob is a self-proclaimed genius who is a graduate of Yale University and a champion of high culture, including the adoption of a transatlantic accent, similar to that of Grammer's portrayal of Dr. Frasier Crane from the sitcoms Cheers and Frasier. He began his career as a sidekick on Krusty the Clown's television show, but after enduring constant abuse, Bob framed his employer for armed robbery in "Krusty Gets Busted", only to be foiled by Bart Simpson, and sent to prison. Bob started seeking revenge against Bart while in prison, and the two became feuding arch-enemies.

Bob made his second major appearance in season three's "Black Widower"; the writers echoed the premise of Wile E. Coyote chasing the Road Runner by having Bob unexpectedly insert himself into Bart's life, threatening to disrupt and end it through murder. Starting with that appearance and thereafter, Bob has assumed the role on The Simpsons of an evil genius. Episodes in which he is a central character typically involve Sideshow Bob being released from prison and executing an elaborate revenge plan, usually foiled by Bart and Lisa. His plans often involve death and destruction, usually targeted at Bart or, less often, Krusty, though he starts targeting the entire Simpson family in season 17. In season 27, however, during the first segment of "Treehouse of Horror XXVI", entitled "Wanted: Dead, Then Alive", Bob finally gets his wish of killing Bart, commenting that he spent 24 years trying to kill a ten-year-old child; however, he becomes bored with Bart dead, so he brings him back to life so that he can repeatedly kill Bart over and over again.

Despite his villainous deeds, Sideshow Bob shares some personality traits of Grammer's character Frasier Crane, and he has been described as "Frasier pickled in arsenic". Several parallels have been explicitly drawn in The Simpsons between Bob and Frasier Crane—Bob's brother Cecil and his father were played by David Hyde Pierce and John Mahoney, respectively, echoing the roles they played in Frasier. Grammer, who based Bob's voice on that of actor Ellis Rabb, has been praised for his portrayals of the character. In 2006, he won an Emmy for Outstanding Voice-Over Performance for his work in the episode "The Italian Bob".

As of season 34, Bob has appeared in more than 40 episodes, had speaking appearances in 23 of these, and been featured as the main character in 14; the most recent of the latter, "Bobby, It's Cold Outside", aired during the 31st season. In addition to his recurring role in the series, Sideshow Bob has made several appearances in other Simpsons media and is mentioned in several more episodes. He appears in the Simpsons Comics, the 2007 video game The Simpsons Game, and stars as the main antagonist in The Simpsons Ride at Universal Studios' theme parks. A lover of Gilbert and Sullivan operettas, Sideshow Bob is also known for his singing voice; several of Grammer's performances have been included in The Simpsons musical compilations.

Appearances

On The Simpsons
The character of Sideshow Bob began his career as the non-speaking sidekick who would only use a 
whistle 
on Krusty the Clown's television show. Bob first appears in "The Telltale Head" (season 1, 1990). In the episode, he and Krusty plan a big event for whoever knows information of who captured the head of Jeremiah Springfield's statue, and joins in on the town mob when it is  discovered that Bart Simpson took it. However, after repeated instances of abuse, including being shot from a cannon and hit constantly with pies, the Yale-educated Bob became angry at Krusty and resentful of the clown's success. In "Krusty Gets Busted" (season 1, 1990), Bob disguised himself as Krusty and framed him for armed robbery of the Kwik-E-Mart. After Krusty is arrested, Bob takes control of the show, introducing children to elements of high culture. However, Bob's reign is short-lived; Bart exposes him as the robber, Krusty is released, and Bob is fired and sent to jail.

In "Black Widower" (season 3, 1992), Bob's first major appearance after framing Krusty, he is released from prison and marries Bart's aunt Selma Bouvier as part of a scheme to inherit money she has invested in the stock market. Bob attempts to blow Selma up during their honeymoon, but Bart again foils the plan and Sideshow Bob returns to prison.

After being paroled from prison in "Cape Feare" (season 5, 1993), Bob targets Bart directly, threatening him repeatedly and forcing the Simpsons into hiding as part of the Witness Relocation Program. Bob follows them to their hideout, a houseboat on Terror Lake, and, after subduing the family, prepares to kill Bart. He allows a final request, however, and Bart asks to hear Bob sing the entire score of H.M.S. Pinafore. Although Bob finishes singing and nearly kills Bart, the delaying tactic leads to Bob's third arrest as the houseboat had drifted all the way back to Springfield.

Bob is released from prison once again in "Sideshow Bob Roberts" (season 6, 1994), and runs for Mayor of Springfield as the Republican Party candidate. He defeats Democratic Party incumbent Joe Quimby in a landslide, but Bart and Lisa discover from Waylon Smithers  that Bob rigged the election by using the names of deceased people. Bob is put on trial and claims himself innocent, but is tricked by Bart and Lisa to expose himself guilty, leading to another incarceration.

Sideshow Bob escapes from prison for the first time in "Sideshow Bob's Last Gleaming" (season 7, 1995), and threatens to blow up Springfield with a nuclear bomb unless the city stops broadcasting all television shows. He is thwarted when he finds out that the bomb itself is a dud, then kidnaps Bart and flies the Wright Brothers' plane in an attempt to kill himself, Bart, and Krusty (who is hiding inside a shack, improvising a performance on the Emergency Broadcast System). This too is thwarted, and Bob returns to prison.

In the following season, Bob takes advantage of the prison's work release program, and appears to be genuinely redeemed. "Brother from Another Series" (season 8, 1997) reveals that Bob only became Krusty's sidekick after his younger brother Cecil failed an audition ten years prior, because Krusty considered Bob to be a perfect comic foil. Reverend Lovejoy declares him a changed man and recommends him for a work release opportunity. Bob is discharged from prison into the care of Cecil, who is now Springfield's chief hydrological and hydrodynamical engineer. However, the scheming Cecil, still smarting over his failed audition for Krusty, tries to frame Bob by sabotaging the Springfield Dam by having it burst across Springfield. Bob, Bart, and Lisa together stop Cecil and save the town, and both brothers, despite Bob's genuine innocence, are sent to prison.

Bob returned in "Day of the Jackanapes" (season 12, 2001), where he discovers in prison that Krusty has erased all of the early shows featuring Sideshow Bob as Krusty himself is declaring his fifth and final retirement after being annoyed with the network executives. Bob is released from prison and develops a plot to kill Krusty using Bart as a suicide bomber during Krusty's retirement special. Everything goes just as Bob had planned, and just when Bob was about to succeed in murdering both his enemies, he overhears Krusty publicly holding himself responsible for turning Bob into a criminal, expressing his regret of mistreating Bob during his years as Sideshow. To appease things, Krusty sings himself a song on Bob's behalf, and being touched by this, Bob decides to abort his plan of attempted murder and reconciles with Krusty, although he is returned to prison for it.

Bob's aid is sought by Springfield police in "The Great Louse Detective" (season 14, 2002). After an attempt is made on Homer Simpson's life, Bob is released from prison to help find the culprit. During the adventure, Bob is given advice to kill Bart without hesitation, instead of being tricked into delay or screwing up on his plots. When the mystery is solved (it was Frank Grimes's son), he returns to murder Bart. However, Bob finds he is "accustomed to his [Bart's] face" and cannot do it.

In "The Italian Bob" (season 17, 2005), it is revealed that Bob had moved to Italy to make a fresh start. He was eventually elected mayor of the village of Salsiccia in Tuscany and marries a local woman named Francesca, with whom he has a son named Gino. The Simpson family, in Italy to retrieve a car for Mr. Burns, encounters him by chance. Bob welcomes them with hospitality on the condition that they not reveal his dark felonious past; however, a drunken Lisa jokes about Bob's criminal deeds and reveals his prison uniform, alienating Bob from his citizens. Bob is angered enough to change his dream of killing Bart to killing the whole Simpson family. Upon catching up to Bob, his wife and his son swear a vendetta with him on all the Simpsons.

The entire Terwilliger family returns in "Funeral for a Fiend" (season 19, 2007) in which Bob's father, Robert Terwilliger Sr., and mother, Dame Judith Underdunk, make their first appearances. Cecil also appears a second time on the show. Bob at first attempts to kill the whole family a second time, but his plan fails. Bob fakes his own death during his trial and locks Bart in the coffin, which he attempts to cremate at the otherwise empty funeral home as all the Terwilligers laugh maniacally. They are foiled by Lisa and the rest of the Simpson family and sent to prison.

In "Sex, Pies and Idiot Scrapes" (season 20, 2008), Bob is one of the wanted criminals in Homer and Ned Flanders's bounty hunter job despite already being in prison, which he escapes from at the end of the episode. In "Wedding for Disaster" (season 20, 2009), Bart and Lisa initially suspect Bob of kidnapping Homer to prevent him from attending his second wedding with Marge (due to a keychain they found had an 'S' and a 'B'), but Krusty provides him with an alibi, explaining to the kids that Bob was with him the whole day. Eventually, Bob and the kids discover the true culprits, Patty and Selma.

In "O Brother, Where Bart Thou?" (season 21, 2009), Bob makes a non-speaking cameo appearance in Bart's dream sequence while the latter becomes desperate of having a younger brother. Cecil makes his third appearance in The Simpsons by appearing alongside Bob; the brothers are flying kites together. Bob reappears again in the episode "The Bob Next Door" (season 21, 2010). He switches faces with his prison cellmate Walt Warren. Bob returns to Springfield and moves into the house next to the Simpson family, assuming Walt's identity. He exploits this to make his latest attempt to kill Bart legally over state lines, but is foiled again and gets taken away by state police.

Bob appears in "At Long Last Leave" (season 23, 2012), the 500th episode of The Simpsons. He attends a town meeting to decide if the Simpson family should be banished from Springfield, and is one of many who express their desire for it to happen. He makes a silent appearance in "Moonshine River" (season 24, 2012), where he runs across the train tracks trying to kill Bart, but ends up getting hit by a train.

In "The Man Who Grew Too Much" (season 25, 2014), he was revealed to be a Chief Scientist for a genetic engineering company named Monsarno, having received the position after he was selected as a test subject and published the results of the experiments to which he was subjected. He and Lisa bond over their interest in Walt Whitman, but Bob reveals that he has also genetically modified himself to give himself various superhuman abilities, intending to acquire DNA from the relics of various historical figures stored in the Springfield Museum to make himself a superhuman dictator. After tempted into a murderous rage, he chases down Bart and Lisa and is about to kill them but however, he is provoked into a fight and he realizes that he has become a crude monster and jumps off the Springfield Dam. The episode ends with Bob underwater in the lake, shown to have survived because the gills he gave himself allow him to live.

Bob also appears in "Clown in the Dumps" (season 26, 2014). Having returned to prison, he offered his condolences to Krusty after the death of his father, Rabbi Krustofsky. Several episodes later, Bob returned in "Blazed and Confused" (season 26, 2014), where he meets Mr. Lassen, Bart's former teacher, who was now reduced to working in prison as a guard after Bart's earlier actions at a "Blazing Guy" festival got him fired. Despite Lassen's offer to get him out, Bob rejects the idea that they team up as Lassen thought that they would take turns gutting Bart.

In "Treehouse of Horror XXVI" (season 27, 2015), in the first segment called "Wanted: Dead, then Alive", Bob uses Milhouse's phone to trap Bart in the band classroom and successfully kills him. In peace with himself, Bob moves on from Bart to pursue other dreams, however, due to Bob chasing down Bart for so long, Bob finds his life so meaningless in Bart's absence that he creates a machine to bring Bart back to life so that he can keep killing his enemy over and over, until the other Simpsons find Bob's location and rescue Bart,  and Bart uses the resurrection machine to turn Bob into a twisted amalgamation of creatures. Bob also appears in the episode "Gal of Constant Sorrow" (season 27, 2016), grunting in annoyance as he wipes off Bart's graffiti from Hettie Mae Boggs' promo poster on the wall along with Snake Jailbird and other inmates.

Bob returns in "Treehouse of Horror XXVII" (season 28, 2016), the 600th episode of The Simpsons. In the opening sequence, he is the self-appointed leader of a four-member group consisting of Homer's enemies, including Bob himself and the ghost of Frank Grimes. Wanting revenge once more, the group attempts to kill the Simpsons but is ultimately killed by Maggie, except Grimes's ghost. In the ending sequence, Bob is one of the characters featured in the "600" song played by Judith Owen. In "Havana Wild Weekend" (season 28, 2016), Sideshow Bob appeared in the backgrounds at the Cuba's check-in.

Bob also makes a non-speaking cameo appearance in "The Nightmare After Krustmas" (season 28, 2016); he is amongst the crowd witnessing Krusty nearly drowning in a frozen lake while holding up a sign saying "Die Clown". He's had a major appearance in "Gone Boy" (season 29, 2017), when he tries to track down the whereabouts of Bart after he goes missing and is presumed dead. Bob finds Bart and proceeds to kill him and Milhouse, but saves them at the last minute due to the influence of the prison therapist's lessons of potentially moving on from wanting to kill Bart. The epilogue features an older Bob, now known as Elder Bob, being an lighthouse keeper and still having regrets of not killing Bart.

In "The Fat Blue Line" (season 31, 2019), Bob escapes from prison once again, only to be hit by a rake truck. Several episodes later, in "Bobby, It's Cold Outside" (season 31, 2019), he is hired to play Santa Claus at a theme park, and later helps the Simpsons discover who is stealing everyone's Christmas gifts. Bob returned in a non-speaking cameo in "Meat Is Murder" (season 33, 2022), where he is seen signing the chests of citizens like Milhouse's father Kirk Van Houten at the celebration of Krusty Burger's 50th anniversary, a callback to the "Die Bart, Die" scene from "Cape Feare".

Other media
In addition to regular roles in the television series, Sideshow Bob has made several appearances in other Simpsons media. Kelsey Grammer recorded several Sideshow Bob lines for The Simpsons Movie, but the scene was cut. Sideshow Bob has made regular appearances in the monthly Simpsons Comics, and several of Kelsey Grammer's singing performances have been included in The Simpsons CD compilations. His performance of the H.M.S. Pinafore in "Cape Feare" was later included on the album Go Simpsonic with The Simpsons, and the song "The Very Reason That I Live" from "The Great Louse Detective" was included on The Simpsons: Testify. A previously unaired song, "Hullaba Lula", originally written for "Day of the Jackanapes", was also included on that compilation. The producers modeled the song after "Zip-a-Dee-Doo-Dah", but were forced to remove the song from the episode when they were unable to obtain the rights to it.

In The Simpsons Game, released in November 2007, Bob has a speaking cameo appearance at the end of the chapter titled "Invasion of the Yokel-Snatchers" in which he was working with Kang and Kodos. Sideshow Bob appears in the 1991 The Simpsons Arcade Game, on the fifth level where he is pulling a cart containing a roast chicken health pick up. Bob was also included as a level boss in the 1991 video game Bart vs. the Space Mutants. Sideshow Bob plays a lead role in The Simpsons Ride, which opened at Universal Studios Florida and Universal Studios Hollywood in May 2008. Voiced by Grammer, he is the main villain in the ride, having escaped from prison to get revenge on the Simpson family.

In The Simpsons: Tapped Out, a city-building game released in February 2012, Sideshow Bob occurs as a bonus. Popping up every couple hours, the players are given a chance to tap on him to receive a small sum of money, and "send" him to jail. In a later update to the game, Sideshow Bob also has a stand in Krusty Land, where players get to pop balloons for a chance to win donuts and Krusty tickets. The Simpsons: Tapped Out Terwilligers content update was released April 14, 2015 and has several references to the Simpsons episodes with Sideshow Bob. This game event was split in 3 acts and ended June 4, 2015. New characters, skins and costumes include Sideshow Bob, Cecil Terwilliger, Gino Terwilliger, Francesca Terwilliger, Dr. Robert Terwilliger Sr., Judith Underdunk, Captain Bob, and Opera Krusty. Most of the event action takes place at Monsarno Research and Opera House.

Character

Creation

Sideshow Bob first appeared in "The Telltale Head", the eighth episode of season one. His design was relatively simple compared to later incarnations, and his hairstyle was rounded. However, towards the end of the episode, he appears again, in a panning shot of a crowd, with his familiar hairstyle. His second appearance, and first major one, was in season one's twelfth episode "Krusty Gets Busted", written by Jay Kogen and Wallace Wolodarsky. Bob's design was updated for "Krusty Gets Busted"; as the episode's animation style evolved, director Brad Bird made the character of Sideshow Bob sleeker and more refined, to fit Grammer's voice technique. Following the re-design, animators tried to redraw his scenes in "The Telltale Head", but had insufficient time before the show was produced.

Bob has no lines of dialogue during the first half of "Krusty Gets Busted"; the character's only communication takes the form of a slide whistle. This was designed to make Bob appear simplistic, so that when he finally spoke, viewers would be surprised to hear his sophisticated vocabulary. An early version of the script for "Krusty Gets Busted" called for James Earl Jones to voice Bob, but the producers instead selected Kelsey Grammer. For Bob's voice, Grammer performed an impression of theatre actor and director Ellis Rabb. Grammer had once worked for Rabb, whose "lamenting tones became [the] foundation for Sideshow Bob".

Sideshow Bob's full name is Robert Underdunk Terwilliger. His last name was first revealed in "Black Widower" while his middle name was first revealed in "Sideshow Bob Roberts". Competing theories as to the origin of his name exist; some sources say he was named after the character Dr. Terwilliker, a megalomaniac outwitted by a boy named Bart in the film The 5,000 Fingers of Dr. T by Dr. Seuss, but others say he was named after Terwilliger Boulevard in Portland, Oregon. Yet another theory is that he was named after Sergeant Terwilliger and Mrs. Underdunk in the pilot episode of the TV show Hunter.

Development
For season three's "Black Widower", the writers echoed the premise of Wile E. Coyote chasing the Road Runner from Looney Tunes cartoons by having Bob unexpectedly insert himself into Bart's life and attempt to kill him. Executive producer Al Jean has compared Bob's character to that of Wile E. Coyote, noting that both are intelligent, yet always foiled by what they perceive as an inferior intellect. For "Black Widower", director David Silverman updated the character model to reflect the animation of director Brad Bird. A rule for earlier episodes featuring Bob called for a recap of his evil deeds; this was dropped after season eight's "Brother from Another Series" when the chronology became too lengthy. Another rule established by the show's writers mandated Bob's return to prison at the end of each episode, although this pattern was abandoned in later episodes like "The Great Louse Detective" and "The Italian Bob".

Bill Oakley and Josh Weinstein, the showrunners for the seventh and eighth seasons, believed that every season of the show should contain an episode starring Sideshow Bob. However, by the seventh season, Bob had already been the focus of four episodes, and writers were having trouble developing new ways to include him. Weinstein describes Bob's dialogue as difficult to write, due to his unique and refined style of speaking. Despite these challenges, however, creators of The Simpsons usually look forward to "Sideshow Bob episodes"; the writers consider them enjoyable to write, and former director Dominic Polcino describes them as "a treat" to work on. In "Black Widower", Sideshow Bob notes that he is a "life-long Republican".

Kelsey Grammer initially expected Sideshow Bob to be a one-time role, and calls him "the most popular character I've ever played". Grammer usually joins the show's "table readings" (wherein cast members read each script together for the first time), and former executive producer David Mirkin described working with Grammer as very pleasant, due to his lively sense of humor. Grammer, Mirkin says, is capable of perfect readings, but noted that the actor dislikes performing Sideshow Bob's evil laugh. In a 2007 interview, Simpsons executive producer Al Jean listed Grammer as one of his favorite guest stars (second only to Phil Hartman), saying "his voice is so rich." Writer George Meyer commented that "writing for Kelsey is great, he can give the kind of purple, florid, melodramatic speeches that most of the characters would never give. And he can sing."

The show's writers admire Grammer's singing voice, and try to include a song for each appearance. Alf Clausen, the primary composer for The Simpsons, commented that "[Grammer] is so great. He's just amazing. You can tell he has this love of musical theater and he has the vocal instrument to go with it, so I know whatever I write is going to be sung the way I've heard it." Clausen composed Sideshow Bob's theme, which is played whenever Bob gets out of prison or is about to commit a sinister action, and was first used in "Cape Feare". It is based on the score of the film Cape Fear, composed by Bernard Herrmann. The musical score for "Cape Feare" earned Clausen an Emmy Award nomination for Outstanding Dramatic Underscore – Series in 1994.

Bob's prisoner number is often 24601, which is Jean Valjean's prisoner number in Les Misérables. Another trademark for Bob is a visual gag of stepping on a rake and being struck in the face with its handle; this joke first appeared in "Cape Feare". To fill time, the writers added nine consecutive iterations of the same joke in quick succession. The sequence has become known as the "rake joke" and was described by Entertainment Weekly as showing "genius in its repetitive stupidity."

Family

The episode "Brother from Another Series" introduces Bob's brother Cecil. After writer Ken Keeler was assigned to write an episode featuring Sideshow Bob, he drew inspiration from episodes of Frasier. He decided to incorporate elements of Grammer's other show into the character of Sideshow Bob, and designed Cecil to resemble Grammer's brother on Frasier. Cecil is voiced by David Hyde Pierce, who portrayed Frasier Crane's brother Niles. Pierce commented, "Normally, I would not do something like this. But how often do you get a chance to work with an actor like Kelsey Grammer and, more importantly, play his brother?" Several of Frasier producers were asked to review the original script and provide feedback. Their comments were positive; they only expressed concern with a very brief scene in which Cecil talks to a visible character whom he refers to as "Maris". In Frasier, Maris Crane is an unseen character, and the producers of Frasier asked that the scene be removed. Many of the interactions between Bob and Cecil were based on those of Niles and Frasier. Cecil was drawn to resemble David Hyde Pierce, while retaining a visual similarity to Sideshow Bob. According to director Pete Michels, it was difficult to draw Bob and Cecil standing together, because of their comically oversized feet.

Cecil returns in season 19's "Funeral for a Fiend", which introduces the brothers' previously unseen father, Dr. Robert Terwilliger, played by John Mahoney. Mahoney portrayed Martin Crane, the father of Grammer's and Pierce's characters in Frasier. Whereas in Frasier, Mahoney played the "down-to-Earth, average guy" to Grammer's and Hyde Pierce's "uppity snobs", Robert Terwilliger Sr. was portrayed as equally highbrow as Bob. His wife, Bob's mother, is Dame Judith Underdunk, "the finest classical actress of her generation." She sports the same curly spiked hair as her two sons. Bob also has a wife named Francesca (voiced by Maria Grazia Cucinotta) and a son named Gino, both of whom were introduced in season 17 episode "The Italian Bob" and returned for "Funeral for a Fiend".

Reception

The character of Sideshow Bob and Grammer's voicework have received many accolades. In 2006, IGN listed him as the second-best "peripheral character" on The Simpsons, commenting that Bob is "a man of contradictions; his goofy appearance, complete with palm tree like hair, doesn't seem to match up to the well spoken and even musically talented maniac." Also that year, Wizard magazine rated Bob as the 66th-greatest villain of all time. Adam Finley of TV Squad wrote that "that baritone voice, the Shakespearean delivery, and the ability to go from calm and collected to stark raving mad all within the same second make Sideshow Bob one of the best recurring characters on the show."

Kelsey Grammer has consistently received praise for his voicework, and has been described as "brilliant", "inimitable" and "a feast of mid-Atlantic anglophilia". In 2006, Grammer won the Primetime Emmy Award for Outstanding Voice-Over Performance for his role in "The Italian Bob"; he had previously won four awards in the Outstanding Lead Actor in a Comedy Series category for his portrayal of the title role on Frasier. In 2008, Grammer was included in Entertainment Weeklys list of the sixteen best Simpsons guest stars; Hyde Pierce was also included in that list. Ken Tucker of Entertainment Weekly wrote that "Kelsey Grammer's grand voice-performance as Sideshow Bob is Frasier pickled in arsenic." In her book My Life as a 10-Year-Old Boy, Nancy Cartwright (who performs the voice of Bart Simpson) wrote that "Kelsey Grammer scores big-time by injecting caustic, bitter, contemptuous and deliciously vile energy into his rendition of Sideshow Bob. Springfield just wouldn't be the same without him."

Most of the episodes featuring Bob have been well received by fans and critics. "Cape Feare" is generally regarded as one of the best episodes of The Simpsons and placed third on Entertainment Weeklys 2003 list of the show's top 25 episodes. IGN considers it the best episode of the fifth season. In 2007, Vanity Fair called it the show's fourth-best episode, because of its "masterful integration of filmic parody and a recurring character". Ben Rayner of the Toronto Star listed "Cape Feare", "Sideshow Bob's Last Gleaming" and "Brother From Another Series" among the best episodes of the series, writing "forget Frasier, these are Kelsey Grammer's best roles." "The Italian Bob" and its writer John Frink won a Writers Guild of America Award in 2007 in the animation category. In December 2009, Robert Canning of IGN ranked the ten episodes to feature Bob that had aired at the time. The first five Bob episodes took up the top five, with "Cape Feare" being ranked first. "The Italian Bob" was ranked tenth, with the explanation that "All the things we love about a Sideshow Bob episode—the vengeance, the familiar settings and characters, the elaborate scheming—were missing from this half-hour. Without it, Bob wasn't nearly as entertaining, and the episode didn't result in a whole lot of laughs." He noted that only "The Italian Bob" and the ninth ranked "Funeral for a Fiend" were "the only ones I'd consider clunkers. The remaining episodes are all quite fun."

The character's line in "Sideshow Bob Roberts", "Attempted murder? Now honestly, what is that? Do they give a Nobel prize for attempted chemistry?", briefly became an Internet meme after a similar defense of President Donald Trump was repeated after the Trump–Ukraine scandal.

Analysis
In Planet Simpson, author Chris Turner writes that Bob is built into a highbrow snob and conservative Republican so that the writers can continually use him as a strawman and pincushion. He represents high culture while Krusty represents low culture, and Bart, stuck in between, always wins out. In the book Leaving Springfield, David L. G. Arnold comments that Bart is a product of a "mass-culture upbringing" and thus is Bob's enemy. Frustrated by his early role as the target of "Krusty's cheap gags", Bob frames Krusty and takes over the show. He changes the content of that show to present readings of classic literature and segments examining the emotional lives of pre-teens. He believes that by exposing the kids to high culture he will improve their lives. Arnold writes that "Bob's own conscience and morality are clearly unaffected by the high culture he represents." He also tries to "manipulate the tastes of the masses" by becoming a criminal mastermind. Arnold believes that this is most apparent in "Sideshow Bob Roberts", wherein he rigs the election to become the mayor of Springfield. When accused of election fraud, he rants, "Your guilty consciences may force you to vote Democratic, but secretly you yearn for a cold-hearted Republican who'll cut taxes, brutalize criminals, and rule you like a king! You need me, Springfield!" He considers himself a member of the social elite, and happily uses Machiavellian methods to acquire and maintain power.

Bob's intelligence serves him in many ways. During the episode "Cape Feare", for example, the parole board asks Bob why he has a tattoo that says "Die, Bart, Die". Bob replies that it is German for "The, Bart, The"; members of the board are impressed by his reasoning. Believing that "nobody who speaks German could be an evil man", they release him. However, his love of high culture is sometimes used against him. In the same episode, Bob agrees to perform the operetta H.M.S. Pinafore in its entirety as a last request for Bart. The tactic stalls Bob long enough for the police to arrest him.

References

Bibliography

Animated characters introduced in 1990
Villains in animated television series
Fictional murderers
Fictional assassins
Fictional attempted suicides
Fictional businesspeople
Fictional clowns
Fictional mayors
Fictional stalkers
Fictional Republicans (United States)
Fictional television personalities
Fictional Yale University people
Male characters in animated series
Male villains
The Simpsons characters
Television characters introduced in 1990
Television sidekicks